Canta mi corazón ("My Heart Sings") is a 1965 Mexican film. It stars Sara García, Libertad Lamarque, Enrique Guzmán.

External links
 

1965 films
Mexican musical drama films
1960s Spanish-language films
1960s Mexican films